Enveloped Ideas is an album recorded by various independent artists making tribute to the Filipino rock band The Dawn. The album was released on the occasion of the band marking 25 years in the music industry.

The album's title is in reference to "Enveloped Ideas", The Dawn's first single which was released in 1987 and is one of its greatest hits.

Track listing
 "Enveloped Ideas" - Techy Romantics
 "Harapin ang Liwanag" - Enemies of Saturn
 "Living Seed" - Lip Service
 "Dreams" - Ginoong Vitalis
 "Sali-Salita" - The Discoball
 "Love Will Set Us Free" - Happy Days Ahead
 "Ang Iyong Paalam" - Overtone
 "I Saw You Coming In" - Join The Club
 "Babaeng Mahiwaga" - Flying Ipis
 "Little Paradise" - Gun Monkeys
 "Difference" - Switch
 "Talaga Naman" - Rubberpool
 "Alam Ko, Alam N’yo" - Milk and Money
 "Runaway" - Soft Pillow Kisses 
 "Tulad ng Dati" - Playphonics

References
 

The Dawn (band) albums